Serbay Can (born 30 June 1998), is a Turkish professional football player, who plays for Turkish club Osmaniyespor FK on loan from Adanaspor as a left back.

Professional career
Serbay made his debut for Adanaspor in 3-1 Süper Lig loss against Fenerbahçe on 3 June 2017.

On 1 January 2019, Can joined Osmaniyespor FK in the TFF Third League on a loan deal for the rest of the season.

References

External links
 
 

Living people
1997 births
People from Adana
Turkish footballers
Adanaspor footballers
Süper Lig players
Association football defenders